The Daghestan pine vole (Microtus daghestanicus) is a species of rodent in the family Cricetidae.
It is found in Russia, Georgia, Armenia, and Azerbaijan.

References

 Baillie, J. 1996.  Microtus daghestanicus.   2006 IUCN Red List of Threatened Species.   Downloaded on 19 July 2007.
 Baillie, J. 1996.  Microtus nasarovi.   2006 IUCN Red List of Threatened Species.   Downloaded on 19 July 2007.
Musser, G. G. and M. D. Carleton. 2005. Superfamily Muroidea. pp. 894–1531 in Mammal Species of the World a Taxonomic and Geographic Reference. D. E. Wilson and D. M. Reeder eds. Johns Hopkins University Press, Baltimore.

Microtus
Mammals of Azerbaijan
Mammals described in 1919
Taxonomy articles created by Polbot